Gregory Diaz IV (born May 2, 2005) is an American actor, singer and dancer. Diaz is known for his role as Quentin in the Netflix series Unbreakable Kimmy Schmidt and Sonny in the musical drama In the Heights.

Early life and education 
Diaz was born and raised in Manhattan, New York City, and is of Puerto Rican descent.  He attended Professional Performing Arts High School for one semester before transferring to Dwight Global Online.

Career 
In 2015, Diaz was cast as Obnoxious Kid #1 in Carrie Pilby. In 2016, Diaz joined the revival and first all-kid professional cast of You're a Good Man, Charlie Brown as Schroeder at the York Theater. Diaz went on to join the closing cast Broadway production of Matilda the Musical as a Bruce swing. Early in 2017, Diaz was cast as Tommy in the last U.S. tour production of Matilda the Musical.

Diaz played the role of boy in January 2018 in the production of Zurich  at NYTW, and earned a nomination for Outstanding ensemble at the New York Innovative Theatre Awards - Home. In March 2018, Diaz appeared in the Netflix series Unbreakable Kimmy Schmidt as Quentin. Diaz was cast as lead role Pedro in May 2018 in the production of Pedro Pan at the Acorn theatre.  He won a NYMF Performance award.

In June 2018, it was announced that Diaz had been cast as Luis Acosta in the comedy film Vampires vs. the Bronx. In December 2019, Diaz made a guest starring appearance in NBC's series New Amsterdam.

Filmography

Stage

Awards and nominations

References

External links 
 
 Gregory Diaz IV on the Internet Broadway Database

21st-century American male actors
American male musical theatre actors
American male television actors
Male actors from New York City
Puerto Rican male actors
American male stage actors
American people of Puerto Rican descent
American male child actors
People from New York City
American male actors
Living people
2005 births